Express Air Cargo is an airline based in Tunis, Tunisia that was founded in 2015.

Fleet
The Express Air Cargo fleet comprises the following aircraft (as of July 2022):

References

External links
 

Airlines of Tunisia
Airlines established in 2015
2015 establishments in Tunisia
Economy of Tunis
Cargo airlines